A mechanical snubber is a mechanical device designed to protect components from excess shock or sway caused by seismic disturbances or other transient forces. During normal operating conditions, the snubber allows for movement in tension and compression. When an impulse event occurs, the snubber becomes activated and acts as a restraint device. The device becomes rigid, absorbs the dynamic energy, and transfers it to the supporting structure.

The image at right shows an isometric view of one style of mechanical snubber. When a disturbance occurs that exceeds the acceleration threshold of the snubber, the ball screw and drum produce angular momentum to the inertia mass. The inertial resistance of the mass engages the resilient capstan to tighten around a hardened mandrel, which is part of the structural tube. This, in turn, causes restraining force against the rotation of the ball screw. During standard operation, the associated acceleration is far below the threshold limit of the snubber and will not activate the capstan spring.

Applications 

Process Impulse Events
 water hammer
 tripped valve
 pipe rupture
 protection from overtravel or overstress by reducing the structural response

External impulse events
 seismic event (such as an earthquake)
 unexpected failure of adjacent components
 high wind loads

References 

Structural connectors